Wylly is a surname. Notable people with the surname include: 

Guy Wylly (1880–1962), British Indian Army officer and Victoria Cross recipient
H. C. Wylly (1858–1932), British Army officer and military historian

See also
Willy
Wyly